Christian Ifeanyi Inyam (born December 20, 1991 in Ikeja) is a Nigerian football forward currently playing for Sunshine Stars F.C.

Career 
He began his career with Festac Sports Academy before 2008 joined to Warri Wolves F.C. and signed in July 2009 a half year loan contract with ASEC Mimosas. On 7 February 2010 left Warri Wolves F.C. for a trial but they could not agree on a transfer fee for the player and he returned to Nigeria.

On 7 February 2010 left Warri Wolves F.C. and signed with Swedish club Helsingsborg IF. After just nine months on 20 November 2010 returned to Nigeria and signed for Sunshine Stars F.C.

On 21 November 2012 was one of eleven players, who signed for Lobi Stars F.C.

Notes

1991 births
Living people
Igbo sportspeople
Nigerian footballers
Association football forwards
ASEC Mimosas players
Expatriate footballers in Ivory Coast
Warri Wolves F.C. players
Nigerian expatriates in Ivory Coast
Helsingborgs IF players
Nigerian expatriate sportspeople in Sweden
Lobi Stars F.C. players
Expatriate footballers in Sweden
Sunshine Stars F.C. players
Sportspeople from Lagos
21st-century Nigerian people